Frank Hunter and Elizabeth Ryan were the defending champions, but decided not to play together. Hunter partnered with Helen Wills, but lost in the semifinals to Ryan and her partner Pat Spence.

Spence and Ryan defeated Jack Crawford and Daphne Akhurst in the final, 7–5, 6–4 to win the mixed doubles tennis title at the 1928 Wimbledon Championships.

Seeds

  Henri Cochet /  Eileen Bennett (quarterfinals)
  Pat Spence /  Elizabeth Ryan (champions)
  Frank Hunter /  Helen Wills (semifinals)
  Gordon Crole-Rees /  Phoebe Watson (quarterfinals)

Draw

Finals

Top half

Section 1

Section 2

Bottom half

Section 3

Section 4

References

External links

X=Mixed Doubles
Wimbledon Championship by year – Mixed doubles